The Mayoral election of 1969 in Pittsburgh, Pennsylvania was held on Tuesday, November 4, 1969. The incumbent mayor, Joe Barr of the Democratic Party chose not to run for his third term.

Primary elections

Outspoken City Councilman Pete Flaherty won the Democratic Primary, despite strong opposition from the city's aging party machine. He ran an aggressive campaign and characterized himself to the public as a reform. Court of Common Pleas Judge Harry Kramer, the endorsed candidate, launched a series of sharp personal attacks on Flaherty, which undermined his own campaign and hastened his defeat.

General election
A total of 181,522 votes were cast. As is typical in the heavily Democratic city, Flaherty won by over 30 points. The Republican nominee was John Tabor, the state's last Secretary of Internal Affairs (under the 1968 Pennsylvania Constitution, this elected position, considered to be the state's third highest office, was eliminated).

External links
Peter F. Flaherty Papers Finding Aid, 1964-1995, AIS.1999.19, Archives Service Center, University of Pittsburgh
John K. Tabor Papers Finding Aid, 1969, AIS.1984.26, Archives Service Center, University of Pittsburgh

References

1969 Pennsylvania elections
1969
1969 United States mayoral elections
1960s in Pittsburgh
November 1969 events in the United States